The fourth Solheim Cup took place from 20 September to 22 September 1996 at St. Pierre Hotel & Country Club, Chepstow, Wales. The United States team retained the cup beating the European team by 17 points to 11.

Teams

Europe
 Mickey Walker (Captain) - England
 Helen Alfredsson - Gothenburg, Sweden
 Laura Davies - Coventry, England
 Marie-Laure de Lorenzi - Biarritz, France
 Lisa Hackney - England
 Trish Johnson - Bristol, England
 Kathryn Marshall - Dundee, Scotland
 Joanne Morley - Sale, England
 Liselotte Neumann - Finspang, Sweden
 Alison Nicholas - Gibraltar
 Catrin Nilsmark - Gothenburg, Sweden
 Dale Reid - Ladybank, Scotland
 Annika Sörenstam - Stockholm, Sweden

Judy Rankin (Captain) - St Louis, Missouri
Pat Bradley - Westford, Massachusetts
Brandie Burton - San Bernardino, California
Beth Daniel - Charleston, South Carolina
Jane Geddes - Huntington, New York
Rosie Jones - Santa Ana, California
Betsy King - Reading, Pennsylvania
Meg Mallon - Natick, Massachusetts
Michelle McGann - West Palm Beach, Florida
Dottie Pepper - Saratoga Springs, New York
Kelly Robbins - Mt. Pleasant, Michigan
Patty Sheehan - Middlebury, Vermont
Val Skinner - Hamilton, Montana

Format
A total of 28 points were available, divided among four periods of team play, followed by one period of singles play. The first period, on Friday morning, was four rounds of foursomes. This was followed in the afternoon by four rounds of fourballs. This schedule was repeated on the Saturday morning and afternoon. The four periods on Friday and Saturday accounted for 16 points. During these team periods, the players played in teams of two. The final 12 points were decided in a round of singles matchplay, in which all 24 players (12 from each team) took part.

Day one
Friday, 20 September 1996

Morning foursomes

Afternoon fourball

Day two
Saturday, 21 September 1996

Morning foursomes

Afternoon fourball

Day three
Sunday, 22 September 1996

Singles

External links
1996 Solheim Cup Match Results

Solheim Cup
Golf tournaments in Wales
Chepstow
Solheim Cup
Solheim Cup
Solheim Cup